Jen is a feminine  given name, frequently a shortened form (hypocorism) of Jennifer, and occasionally a surname. It may refer to:

Given name

People
 Jen Adams (born 1979), Australian lacrosse coach and former player
 Jennifer Baxter (curler) (born 1987), Canadian curler
 Jen Buczkowski (born 1985), American former soccer player
 Jen Button (born 1977), Canadian former swimmer
 Jen DeNike (born 1971), American video and performance artist
 Jen Green (born 1955), British non-fiction author
 Jen Hadfield (born 1978), English poet
 Jen Hoy (born 1991), American soccer player
 Jen Hudak (born 1986), American freestyle skier
 Jen Jacobs (1956–2016), Australian cricketer
 Jen Kirkman, American stand-up comedian, screenwriter and actress
 Jen Lancaster (born 1967), American author
 Jen Ledger (born 1989), English drummer and co-vocalist for the American Christian rock band Skillet
 Jen Miller (born 1972), American actress, writer, painter, director, preacher and poet
 Jen Psaki (born 1978), White House Communications Director for President Obama
 Jen Schoullis (born 1989), American women's ice hockey player
 Jen Sorensen (born 1974), American cartoonist and illustrator
 Jen Taylor (born 1973), American actress

Fictional characters
 Jen (Gelfling), the protagonist of the film The Dark Crystal
 Jen Handley, in the Australian soap opera Neighbours
 Jen Lindley, in the American television series Dawson's Creek
 Jennifer Rappaport, the American soap opera One Life to Live
Jen Scotts, the Pink Ranger on Power Rangers Time Force
Jen Barber, The Relationship Manager for the IT Department at Reynholm Industry in the British television show The IT Crowd

Surname
 Gish Jen (born 1955), American writer
 Ruth Jên (born 1964), Welsh artist
 Richie Jen (born 1966), Taiwanese singer and actor
 Selina Jen (born 1981), a member of the Taiwanese girl group S.H.E.
 Ren (surname) (Jen 任 in Wade–Giles)

See also
 Jennifer (given name)
 Jenny (given name)

References

Feminine given names
Masculine given names
Hypocorisms